The 1999 Colgate Red Raiders football team was an American football team that represented Colgate University during the 1999 NCAA Division I-AA football season. Colgate was the Patriot League co-champion, but lost in the first round of the national Division I-AA playoffs.

In its fourth season under head coach Dick Biddle, the team compiled a 10–2 record. Tom McCarroll and Ryan Vena were the team captains. 

The Red Raiders outscored opponents 430 to 253. Colgate's 5–1 record earned a tie for the Patriot League championship.

Unranked in the preseason Division I-AA national poll, the Red Raiders briefly appeared at No. 24 early in the season, then returned to the top 25 in mid-November. Colgate ended the year ranked No. 18 and qualified for the Division I-AA playoffs by winning its conference, even though it was the lower-ranked of the two Patriot League co-champions; Lehigh also qualified, however, with an at-large berth. Both Patriot League playoff teams lost in the first round.

Colgate played its home games at Andy Kerr Stadium in Hamilton, New York.

Schedule

References

Colgate
Colgate Raiders football seasons
Patriot League football champion seasons
Colgate Red Raiders football